Sánchez Taboada is a borough of the municipality of Tijuana in Baja California, Mexico.

Sánchez Taboada borough is located south of the city center and southwest of La Mesa.

References

Boroughs of Tijuana